The Homeland Defenders Party is a centrist political party in Egypt. It was founded in 2013 by Galal Haridy and a group of retired officers. In an interview in December 2013, about half a year after al-Sisi's military coup, Haridy expressed support for the "efforts made by the army and police in confronting terrorism."

It is currently the largest member party of the Call of Egypt coalition and is seen as supportive towards President Abdel Fattah el-Sisi.

References

Democratic socialist parties in Africa
Left-wing nationalist parties
Nationalist parties in Egypt
Political parties in Egypt
Political parties with year of establishment missing
Socialist parties in Egypt